Walex Raimundo dos Santos (born ), also known as Lacraia, is a Brazilian futsal player who plays as a winger for Peñíscola and the Brazil national futsal team.

References

External links
Liga Nacional de Futsal profile
The Final Ball profile

1993 births
Living people
Brazilian men's futsal players
Giti Pasand FSC players
Sportspeople from Sergipe